Skylab was the first space station launched into orbit by the United States.

Skylab may also refer to:
Skylab (band), a musical outfit formed in 1993
Skylab (film), 2021 Indian Telugu-language film
Skylab Gallery, gallery and performance space in Columbus, Ohio
Skylab, a tower structure at Amundsen–Scott South Pole Station
Rogério Skylab, Brazilian artist
Skylab (album), a 1999 album by Rogério Skylab

See also
Skylab 1, the uncrewed launch of Skylab
Skylab 2, the first crewed mission to Skylab
Skylab II, a proposed lunar space station named in homage to Skylab
Skylab 3, the second crewed mission to Skylab
Skylab 4, the third and last crewed mission to Skylab
Skylab B, a backup Skylab station, proposed for a second launch but never used
Skylab Rescue, a contingency mission for a stranded Skylab crew, never needed
Skylab IX, a live album by Rogério Skylab
Skylab One (disambiguation)
Skylab Two (disambiguation)
Skylab Three (disambiguation)
Skylab Four (disambiguation)